Muensterella is a fossil stem-octopod known from a handful of specimens from German Solnhofen plattenkalk.

References

Prehistoric cephalopod genera